The Extraordinary and Plenipotentiary Ambassador of Peru to the State of Kuwait is the official representative of the Republic of Peru to the State of Kuwait.

Both countries established relations on December 1, 1975, and have maintained them since. After the Iraqi invasion of Kuwait, Peru condemned the invasion and supported Kuwait. Peru maintains an embassy in Kuwait City, which closed at one point but reopened in 2010.

List of representatives

See also
List of ambassadors of Peru to Qatar
List of ambassadors of Peru to Saudi Arabia
List of Consuls-General of Peru in Dubai

References

Kuwait
Peru